Epicrocis holophaea is a species of snout moth in the genus Epicrocis. It was described by George Hampson in 1926. It is found in South Africa.

References

Moths described in 1926
Phycitini
Endemic moths of South Africa